Pattimattom  is a village in Ernakulam district in the Indian state of Kerala. It is situated 17 km northwest of Muvattupuzha at the junction of Kolenchery-Perumbavoor Road and SH41 Palarivattom-Muvattupuzha Road.
It is one of the main parts of Perumbavoor, situated in the middle of both Perumbavoor and Kolenchery.

Demographics
 India census, Pattimattom had a population of 19711 with 9537 males and 10174 females.

Location

References

Villages in Ernakulam district
Neighbourhoods in Kochi